David V. Monasterio Ruiz (born January 13, 1971) is a former international freestyle and butterfly swimmer from Puerto Rico, who participated at the 1992 Summer Olympics for his native country. He won three relay medals (one silver, two bronze) at the 1991 Pan American Games in Havana, Cuba. He has three brothers, Eric, Eugenio, and Manuel. David attended the University of North Carolina at Chapel Hill, and earned an MBA from Indiana University Bloomington.

References

1971 births
Living people
Puerto Rican male swimmers
Male butterfly swimmers
Puerto Rican male freestyle swimmers
Swimmers at the 1991 Pan American Games
Swimmers at the 1992 Summer Olympics
Olympic swimmers of Puerto Rico
Pan American Games silver medalists for Puerto Rico
Pan American Games bronze medalists for Puerto Rico
Pan American Games medalists in swimming
Central American and Caribbean Games gold medalists for Puerto Rico
Competitors at the 1990 Central American and Caribbean Games
Central American and Caribbean Games medalists in swimming
Medalists at the 1991 Pan American Games